Smokeless is an unincorporated community in Mercer County, West Virginia, United States.

The community took its name from the local Smokeless Coal Company.

References 

Unincorporated communities in Mercer County, West Virginia